A list of the films produced in Mexico in 1955 (see 1955 in film):

1955

See also
1955 in Mexico

External links

1955
Films
Mexican